The Carriers Are Waiting is a French-Belgian-Swiss 1999 film directed by Benoît Mariage. It was awarded the Bronze Horse prize for best film of that year by the Stockholm International Film Festival.

Cast
 Benoît Poelvoorde : Roger Closset
 Morgane Simon : Louise Closset
 Bouli Lanners : Coach
 Dominique Baeyens : Madeleine Closset
 Philippe Grand'Henry : Felix
 Jean-François Devigne : Michel Closset
 Lisa Lacroix : Jocelyne
 Philippe Nahon : Overseer
 Édith Le Merdy : Edith
 Patrick Audin : Patrick

References

External links
 

French comedy-drama films
1990s French films
Belgian comedy-drama films
Swiss comedy-drama films